Jane Tryphoena Stephens (1812? – 15 January 1896) was a British actress who became famous as she became older.

Life

Her first surname is unknown as she sometimes appeared as "Miss Stephens". She had a husband called Joseph Stephens who was a solicitor's clerk. Before she took to the stage in 1840 she ran a tobacconists. She took a variety of roles but it was not until 1854 that she found her niche. She took on "grandmotherly" type roles in a number of productions and was affectionately known as "Granny" Stephens. She finished her career on 9 July 1889 with a benefit programme at the Shaftesbury Theatre. The committee responsible for promoting the show included R D'Oyly Carte, George Edwardes and C H Hawtrey.

Stephens died in Clapham Common in 1896 of bronchitis. She was cremated on 20 January and her ashes were buried in the Actors' Acre in Brookwood Cemetery in Woking.

Legacy
There is a portrait of "Mrs Stephens" in the National Portrait Gallery by William Bond dating from the early 19th century.

References

1812 births
1896 deaths
British stage actresses
19th-century British actresses
Deaths from bronchitis
Burials at Brookwood Cemetery